"My Whole World Is Falling Down" is a song written by Bill Anderson and Jerry Crutchfield and performed by Brenda Lee. Its chorus is based on the nursery rhyme "London Bridge Is Falling Down". The song reached #8 on the Adult Contemporary chart and #24 on the Billboard Hot 100 in 1963.  The song is featured on her 1964 album, By Request.  The song also reached #16 in Australia.

Brenda Lee's recording of the song appeared in the 1982 Costa-Gavras film Missing.

Sylvie Vartan version (in French) 

Sylvie Vartan released a French version titled "Si je chante" as part of an eponymous EP in 1963.

In France her version of the song spent three weeks on the singles sales chart (from 18 to 31 January and from 8 to 14 February 1964).

Charts

Other versions 
Donald Lautrec released a French cover "Ce serait la fin du monde" in 1963.
Mona Gustafsson covered the song on her 1979 album En stund till.
Siniestro Total released a Spanish cover "Si yo canto" in 1984.

See also 
 List of number-one singles of 1964 (France)

References

1963 songs
1963 singles
Songs written by Bill Anderson (singer)
Songs written by Jerry Crutchfield
Brenda Lee songs
Sylvie Vartan songs
Decca Records singles
RCA Victor singles
Number-one singles in France
Mona Gustafsson songs
Song recordings produced by Owen Bradley